Anastasia is a Greek TV series that was aired in season 1993-94 by Mega Channel. The series was one of the most successful series of that period. It is written by Mirella Papaeconomou and it stars Myrto Alikaki, Alkis Kourkoulos and Minas Hatzisavvas. The series was about a love triangle and was considered pretty bold for the Greek society of 1990s. The soundtrack of the series that was composed by Dimitris Papadimitriou and performed by Eleftheria Arvanitaki, became the first platinum certified TV soundtrack in Greece.

Plot
Anastasia is a young woman who works as model and studies acting. The plot is about her parallel relationship with both a young man and his father. This relationship upsets the family relationships between these two men.

Cast
Myrto Alikaki
Alkis Kourkoulos 
Minas Hatzisavvas
Gerasimos Skiadaresis
Marianna Toumasatou

References

External links

Mega Channel original programming
Greek drama television series
1993 Greek television series debuts
1994 Greek television series endings
1990s Greek television series
Television shows filmed in Greece